Syed Sajid Mehdi (born 18 June 1948) is a Pakistani politician who has been a member of the National Assembly of Pakistan, since August 2018. Previously he was a member of the National Assembly from June 2013 to May 2018.

Early life
He was born on 18 June 1948.

Political career

He ran for the seat of the National Assembly of Pakistan as a candidate off Pakistan Muslim League (Q) (PML-Q) from Constituency NA-167 (Vehari-I) in 2008 Pakistani general election but was unsuccessful. He received 38,383 votes and lost the seat to Chaudhry Nazeer Ahmad. In the same election, he also ran for the seat of the National Assembly as an indedpent candidate Constituency NA-168 (Vehari-II) but was unsuccessful. He received 708 votes and lost the seat to Azeem Daultana.

He was elected to the National Assembly as a candidate of Pakistan Muslim League (N) (PML-N) from Constituency NA-168 (Vehari-II) in 2013 Pakistani general election. He received 69,049 votes and defeated Ishaq Khan Khakwani. During his tenure as Member of the National Assembly, he served as Federal Parliamentary Secretary for Housing and Works.

He was re-elected to the National Assembly as a candidate of PML-N from Constituency NA-163 (Vehari-II) in 2018 Pakistani general election.

References

Living people
Pakistan Muslim League (N) politicians
Punjabi people
Pakistani MNAs 2013–2018
1948 births
Pakistani MNAs 2018–2023